is a town located in Shimoniikawa District, Toyama Prefecture, Japan. , the town had an estimated population of 11,574 and a population density of 51.1 persons per km. The town claims to be the birthplace of beach volleyball.

Geography
Asahi is located in north-west Toyama Prefecture, in between the North Alps and the Sea of Japan. Mount Shirouma is the highest point, with an elevation of 2,932 meters.

Climate
The town has a Humid subtropical climate (Köppen Cfa) characterized by hot summers and cold winters with heavy snowfall. The average annual temperature in Asahi is 13.9 °C. The average annual rainfall is 2219 mm with September as the wettest month. The temperatures are highest on average in August, at around 26.2 °C, and lowest in January, at around 2.5 °C.

Surrounding municipalities
Toyama Prefecture
Kurobe
Nyūzen
Niigata Prefecture
Itoigawa
Nagano Prefecture
Hakuba

Demographics
Per Japanese census data, the population of Asahi has decreased over the past 50 years.

History
The area of present-day Asahi was part of ancient Etchū Province. During the Edo period, the Tomari developed as a post station on the Hokurikudo highway. The area was organised as part of Shimoniikawa District, Toyama after the Meiji restoration. The modern town of Tomari was created with the establishment of the municipalities system on April 1, 1889. It merged with six surrounding villages to form the town of Asahi on August 1, 1954.

Economy
Asahi is dependent on agriculture and commercial fishing. Notable crops include rice, asparagus, and Spaghetti squash.

Education
Asahi has two public elementary schools and one public middle school operated by the town government, and one public high school operated by the Toyama Prefectural Board of Education.

Transportation

Railway
 Ainokaze Toyama Railway Line
  –

Highway

Local attractions
Fudōdō Site, ruins of a Jōmon period  settlement and a National Historic Site.

References

External links

  

 
Towns in Toyama Prefecture
Populated coastal places in Japan